James Thaddeus Hubbell (1855–1929) was a one-term Democratic mayor of Norwalk, Connecticut from 1894 to 1895. He served as a judge of the town court, and as a member of the Connecticut House of Representatives representing Wilton in 1882 and 1883.

Family 
He was the son of John William Hubbell and Mary Merwin.

Associations 
Member, Worshipful Master (1908), St. Johns Lodge Number 6 Free and Accepted Masons

References 

1855 births
1929 deaths
Connecticut lawyers
Mayors of Norwalk, Connecticut
Democratic Party members of the Connecticut House of Representatives
People from Wilton, Connecticut
19th-century American lawyers